Wyoming Highway 291 (WYO 291) is a  north-south Wyoming state road located in central Park County and provides access to Buffalo Bill State Park, Buffalo Bill Dam, and Buffalo Bill Reservoir as well as other areas southwest of Cody.

Route description
Wyoming Highway 291 begins its southern end at Park CR 6WX (Southfork Road) 
near the south end of the Buffalo Bill Reservoir, southwest of Cody.  Highway 291, named Southfork Road, meanders along the southeastern side of the state park and reservoir before traveling more northeast in direction toward Cody. WYO 291 then turns to head due north. At just under 9.5 miles, WYO 291 reaches its northern terminus at the Buffalo Bill Cody Scenic Byway, better known as US 14/US 16/US 20 (Yellowstone Avenue), on the west side of Cody.

Major intersections

See also

 List of state highways in Wyoming
 List of highways numbered 291

References

External links 

 Wyoming State Routes 200-299
 WYO 291 - US 14/US 16/US 20 to Southfork Rd

Transportation in Park County, Wyoming
291